Rafea Al-Ruwaili  (born July 5, 1990) is a Saudi football player who plays as goalkeeper for Al-Orobah.

References

1990 births
Living people
Saudi Arabian footballers
Al-Orobah FC players
Arar FC players
Place of birth missing (living people)
Saudi First Division League players
Saudi Professional League players
Saudi Second Division players
Saudi Fourth Division players
Association football goalkeepers